Daniela Ciancio (born 5 March 1965) is an Italian costume designer, noted chiefly for her film costumes.  In 2005, she won the David di Donatello for Best Costumes for her work on the Antonietta De Lillo film Il resto di niente.  Ciancio also designed the costumes for the 2013 film La grande bellezza.

Biography
Ciancio graduated high school in 1983, and proceeded to study stage design at the Accademia di Belle Arti di Napoli, earning a diploma in scenography.  In 1986, she began a collaboration with the Teatro di San Carlo and the Nuovo Teatro Nuovo di Napoli.  In 1994, she was awarded a diploma at the Centro Sperimentale di Cinematografia, winning an internship with Piero Tosi.  Her career has spanned cinema, theatre, opera and television.

Career

Cinema
 The Face of an Angel (directed by Michael Winterbottom, 2014)
 La grande bellezza (Paolo Sorrentino, 2013)
 Il Divo (Paolo Sorrentino, 2008)
 Mission: Impossible III (J. J. Abrams, 2006)
 Il resto di niente (Antonietta De Lillo, 2005)

Opera
 Cavalleria Rusticana (Roberto de Simone, Teatro di San Carlo, 2007)
 Nabucco with Roberta Guidi di Bagno (S. Vizioli), Choregies d'Orange)
 Romeo and Juliet (D. Deane, Victoria and Albert Hall)

Television
 L'Oro di Scampia (M. Pontecorvo, 2014)
 Il clan dei Camorristi (A. Angelina and A. Sweet, 2013)
 Applausi e sputi (R. Tognazzi, 2012)
 La nuova squadra - Spaccanapoli (Alberto Bader, 2008)

Board service
Between 2009 and 2013 Ciancio has been a member of the board of the European Film Academy (EFA), European Film Award – Berlin and she is a jury member of the David di Donatello since 2005.

Teaching
Since 2004 Ciancio has taught costume design in, among other places, the “Scuola del Cinema Gianmaria Volonte’” (Rome) and “Lab Costume”.

Awards and honors

References

External links
 http://www.esquire.com/blogs/mens-fashion/great-beauty-daniela-ciancio-interview
 Hollywoodreproter.com
  Esquire.com
 Kineo.info
 Cinemaitalino.info
 Nonsolocinema.com
 Vivitelese.it

1965 births
Living people
Italian costume designers
Accademia di Belle Arti di Napoli alumni